The 521st Fighter-Bomber Squadron is an inactive United States Air Force unit.  Its last was assigned to the 415th Bombardment Group, stationed at Dalhart Army Airfield, Texas.  It was inactivated on 5 Apr 1944.

History 
Established in early 1943 as an A-24 dive bomber squadron. Assigned to the Army Air Forces School of Applied Tactics, Air University in Florida as a training unit to develop combat tactics to be used by overseas combat units. Also equipped with P-39 fighters and A-36 dive bombers with the phaseout of the A-24.

When AAFSAT closed, was re-assigned as a B-25 medium training squadron and supported Army maneuvers. Inactivated in April 1944 with re-organization of training command designations.

Lineage 
 Constituted 667th Bombardment Squadron (Dive) on 12 Feb 1943.
 Activated on 15 Feb 1943.
 Re-designated 521st Fighter-Bomber Squadron 10 Aug 1943.
 Disbanded on 5 Apr 1944.

Assignments 
 415th Bombardment Group, 15 Feb 1943-5 Apr 1944.

Stations 
 Alachua Army Airfield, Florida, 15 Feb 1943
 Orlando Army Airbase, Florida, 2 Mar 1944;
 Dalhart Army Airfield, Texas, 19 Mar-5 Apr 1944

Aircraft 
 A-24 Banshee (1943)
 P-39 Airacobra (1943)
 A-36 Apache (1943)
 B-25 Mitchell (1943-1944)

References 

 

Fighter squadrons of the United States Army Air Forces
Military units and formations disestablished in 1944